Archilestes californicus
Archilestes exoletus
Archilestes grandis
Archilestes guayaraca
Archilestes latialatus
Archilestes neblina
Archilestes regalis
Archilestes tuberalatus
Austrolestes aleison
Austrolestes analis
Austrolestes annulosus
Austrolestes aridus
Austrolestes cingulatus
Austrolestes colensonis
Austrolestes insularis
Austrolestes io
Austrolestes leda
Austrolestes minjerriba
Austrolestes psyche
Chalcolestes parvidens
Chalcolestes viridis
Indolestes albicaudus
Indolestes alfurus
Indolestes alleni
Indolestes anomalus
Indolestes aruanus
Indolestes assamicus
Indolestes bellax
Indolestes bilineatus
Indolestes birmanus
Indolestes boninensis
Indolestes cheesmanae
Indolestes coeruleus
Indolestes cyaneus
Indolestes dajakanus
Indolestes davenporti
Indolestes divisus
Indolestes extraneus
Indolestes floresianus
Indolestes goniocercus
Indolestes gracilis
Indolestes indicus
Indolestes inflatus
Indolestes linsleyi
Indolestes lundquisti
Indolestes luxatus
Indolestes lygisticercus
Indolestes obiri
Indolestes peregrinus
Indolestes pulcherrimus
Indolestes risi
Indolestes sutteri
Indolestes tenuissimus
Indolestes vitiensis
Lestes alacer
Lestes alfonsoi
Lestes amicus
Lestes angularis
Lestes apollinaris
Lestes auripennis
Lestes auritus
Lestes australis
Lestes barbatus
Lestes basidens
Lestes bipupillatus
Lestes concinnus
Lestes congener
Lestes curvatus
Lestes debellardi
Lestes dichrostigma
Lestes disjunctus
Lestes dissimulans
Lestes dorothea
Lestes dryas
Lestes elatus
Lestes eurinus
Lestes falcifer
Lestes fernandoi
Lestes forcipatus
Lestes forficula
Lestes garoensis
Lestes helix
Lestes henshawi
Lestes ictericus
Lestes inaequalis
Lestes japonicus
Lestes jerrelli
Lestes jurzitzai
Lestes macrostigma
Lestes malabaricus
Lestes malaisei
Lestes minutus
Lestes nigriceps
Lestes nodalis
Lestes numidicus
Lestes ochraceus
Lestes orientalis
Lestes pallidus
Lestes patricia
Lestes paulistus
Lestes pictus
Lestes pinheyi
Lestes plagiatus
Lestes praevius
Lestes pruinescens
Lestes quadristriatus
Lestes rectangularis
Lestes regulatus
Lestes scalaris
Lestes secula
Lestes sigma
Lestes silvaticus
Lestes simplex
Lestes simuulans
Lestes simulatrix
Lestes spatula
Lestes sponsa
Lestes spumarius
Lestes sternalis
Lestes stultus
Lestes sutteri
Lestes tarryi
Lestes temporalis
Lestes tenuatus
Lestes thoracicus
Lestes tikalus
Lestes trichonus
Lestes tricolor
Lestes tridens
Lestes umbrinus
Lestes uncifer
Lestes undulatus
Lestes unguiculatus
Lestes urubamba
Lestes vidua
Lestes vigilax
Lestes virens
Lestes virgatus
Lestes viridulus
Orolestes durga
Orolestes motis
Orolestes octomaculatus
Orolestes selysi
Orolestes wallacei
Platylestes heterostylus
Platylestes pertinax
Platylestes platystylus
Platylestes praecellens
Platylestes praemorsus
Platylestes quercifolius
Sinhalestes orientalis
Sympecma fusca
Sympecma gobica
Sympecma paedisca

References